The Broken Gate is a lost 1920 American silent drama film directed by Paul Scardon and starring Bessie Barriscale. It was distributed jointly by W. W. Hodkinson and Pathé Exchange.

Cast
Bessie Barriscale as Aurora Lane
Joseph Kilgour as William Henderson
Sam De Grasse as 'Hod' Brooks
Marguerite De La Motte as Anne Oglesby
Arnold Gray as Dieudonne 'Don' Lane (credited as Arnold Gregg)
Lloyd Bacon as John
Evelyn Selbie as Julia Delafield
Alfred Allen as Eph Adamson

References

External links

1920 films
Lost American films
American silent feature films
Films directed by Paul Scardon
Films based on American novels
Pathé Exchange films
American black-and-white films
Silent American drama films
1920 drama films
Films distributed by W. W. Hodkinson Corporation
1920 lost films
Lost drama films
1920s American films